Korday is a district of Jambyl Region in south-eastern Kazakhstan. The administrative center of the district is the auyl of Korday.

See also
2020 Dungan–Kazakh ethnic clashes
Otar (village)

References

Districts of Kazakhstan
Jambyl Region